Arthur Field may refer to:

 Arthur Field (trade unionist) (1869–1944), British trade unionist and socialist activist
 Arthur Mostyn Field (1855–1950), British Royal Navy officer
 A. N. Field (Arthur Nelson Field, 1882–1963), New Zealand journalist, writer and political activist

See also
 Arthur Fields (1884–1953), American singer and songwriter
 Arthur Fields (photographer) (1901–1994), Ukrainian-born Irish street photographer